The Central Reserve Bank of Peru (BCRP) is the Peruvian central bank. It mints and issues metal and paper money, the sol. 

Its branch in Arequipa was established in 1871, and it served the city by issuing money as well as maintaining a good reputation for savings accounts in Southern Peru. It is the equivalent of the Federal Reserve of the United States or the European Central Bank in Europe.

The Constitution states that the purpose of the Central Reserve Bank is to preserve monetary stability. The Central Reserve Bank's target annual inflation is 2.0 percent, with a tolerance of one percentage point upward and downward; its policies are aimed at achieving that goal.

The Constitution also assigns the following functions to the Central Reserve Bank: regulating currency and credit of the financial system, administering the international reserves in its care, issuing banknotes and coins, reporting regularly to the country on national finances, and managing the profitability of funds.

Presidents 

Eulogio Romero Salcedo, 1922-1925
Agustín de la Torre González, 1926-1927
Eulogio Romero Salcedo, 1928-1929
Enrique Ferreyros, 1930-1931
Manuel Augusto Olaechea, 1931-1934
Manuel Prado Ugarteche, 1934-1939
Fernando Gazzani, 1939-1945
Francisco Tudela y Varela, 1945-1948
Pedro Beltrán Espantoso, 1948-1950
Clemente de Althaus Dartnell, 1950-1952
Daniel Olaechea, 1952
Andrés F. Dasso, 1952-1958
Enrique Bellido, 1959-1964
Alfredo C. Ferreyros, 1964-1966
Fernando Schwalb, 1966-1968
José Morales Urresti, 1968
Carlos Vidal, 1968
Alfredo Rodríguez Martínez, 1968-1969
Emilio G. Barreto, 1969-1975
Carlos Santisteban de Noriega, 1975-1977
Germán de la Melena Guzmán, 1977-1978
Manuel Moreyra Loredo, 1978-1980
Richard Webb Duarte, 1980-1985
Leonel Figueroa Ramírez, 1985-1987
Pedro Coronado Labó, 1987-1990
Jorge Chávez Álvarez, 1990-1992
Germán Suárez Chávez, 1992-2001
Richard Webb Duarte, 2001-2003
Javier Silva Ruete, 2003-2004
Óscar Dancourt Masías, 2004-2006
Julio Velarde Flores, 2006-
Source:

See also 
 Economy of Peru
 List of Jesuit sites
 Peruvian inti
 Peruvian sol

References

External links
  

Banks of Peru
Peru
Economy of Peru
1922 establishments in Peru
Banks established in 1922